Salekasa is a village and a tehsil in the Deori subdivision of Gondia district in Nagpur division in the Berar region in the state of Maharashtra, India. In 2020, a cache of explosives and weapons were found in a Naxal hideout in Salekasa.

References 

Cities and towns in Gondia district
Talukas in Maharashtra